The Mansion is located in Melbourne, Australia, at 83 Queens Road. The multi-level historic building was an electronic music venue. The Mansion was once voted No.7 in the world’s top 10 clubs.

History 
The Mansion was originally named Clarence House and was built around the late 1800s for  financier Laurence Benjamin. The residence was occupied by many famous people including William Jamieson, a civil surveyor & businessman who died at Clarence House from cancer on 8 May 1926.

Musical artists / DJs 
Renaissance parties were held with local and international DJs every year bringing the sounds of the UK club and record label to Australia.

Closure 

Property developers City Pacific had bought the land adjacent to The Mansion and had commissioned the Buchan Group to build an apartment complex. While construction on the apartment complex above and behind the mansion site was underway one builder was killed and many others were injured whilst working on the eighth storey. The company involved in pouring the molds for the concrete pillars, Melbourne Transit Pty Ltd was convicted and fined  $100,000 by county court judge for breaching occupation and safety regulations and forced into liquidation.

The heritage listed property needed to be excavated to make way for a 3-storey underground car park that extended 10 metres below ground surface level. The Mansion building had to be safely supported during all phases of the work, especially during excavation of the 10m deep basement. This excavation was the critical activity that could result in damage to the Mansion.
The retention of a heritage building on this commercial site imposed financial penalties on the development as well as physical constraints. If the Mansion was ever to remain a nightclub it would need to be soundproofed if the venue was to comply with zoning rules and noise emission restraints.

Current status 

, The Mansion, has been shadowed by a high-rise apartment block.

See also
List of electronic dance music venues
Future Entertainment
Summadayze
Future Music Festival

References 

Music venues in Melbourne
Nightclubs in Melbourne
Electronic dance music venues